Teachers Mutual Bank Limited (formerly the New South Wales Teachers Credit Union) is one of the largest mutual banks in Australia, with more than 200,000 members and assets of over $8 billion.

Membership is primarily open to serving retired teachers, university students undertaking education degrees and diplomas that will qualify them as registered school teachers, other employees in the Australian education sector, and immediate family members of people who fit the primary criteria.

As a mutually owned institution, each member (account holder) holds one equal share in the organisation and all profits are intended to be returned to members by way of lower fees and interest rates than those available from commercial banks and other for-profit financial institutions.

Initially formed in 1966 as the New South Wales Teachers Credit Union, with membership restricted to public (state) school teachers in New South Wales, the membership of Teachers Mutual Bank is today spread across New South Wales, the Australian Capital Territory, Western Australia, South Australia and the Northern Territory.

Having always had a highly decentralised membership (their teacher members working in schools spread across the state), the bank was an early innovator in providing banking services with telephone and, later, internet banking. It currently maintains six core branches; three located in Sydney (one being the head office) and one in each of the Hunter Region, the Australian Capital Territory and Western Australia. The head office branch is located at Homebush on Powell Street in Sydney's inner western suburbs.

Since mergers with two credit unions in 2015-16, three divisional branches exist in Perth (trading as UniBank) and one in Sydney (trading as Firefighters Mutual Bank).

Teachers Mutual Bank is a long-standing supporter of many education programs and has made a significant contribution to public education in New South Wales. This support extends across a broad range of educational programs including sport, the arts, conferences and workshops as well as significant activities and events at all levels of the school system.

References

External links

 Teachers Mutual Bank Limited

Banks of Australia
Credit unions of Australia
1966 establishments in Australia
Banks established in 1966
Financial services companies based in Sydney
Teaching in Australia